The 1942 FAI Cup Final was the final match of the 1941–42 FAI Cup, a knock-out association football competition contested annually by clubs affiliated with the Football Association of Ireland. It took place on Sunday 26 April 1942 at Dalymount Park in Dublin, and was contested by Dundalk and Cork United. Dundalk won 3–1 to win their first FAI Cup.

Background
The two sides' three previous meetings that season had seen one win apiece and one draw. Dundalk had finished fourth in the League, and had just missed out on the League of Ireland Shield, finishing as runners-up. To reach the final, they had defeated non-League Distillery (2–1), Shelbourne (2–1), and Shamrock Rovers (2–1 in a replay following a 2–2 draw). They had lost their three previous appearances in FAI Cup finals.

Cork United had already won that season's League of Ireland title, and were chasing a second League and Cup Double in a row, having only been founded in 1940. They had defeated Dundalk in the semi-final on the way to winning the FAI Cup the season before. They overcame Cork Bohemians (5–2), St James's Gate (1–0), and Drumcondra (4–2) to reach the 1942 final.

Match

Summary
The Cork side put Dundalk under pressure from kick-off, and had numerous chances through winger Jack O'Reilly, while Florrie Bourke hit the crossbar. Cork then had a goal disallowed for offside against Bourke in the 17th minute. It took until early in the second half for Cork to make the breakthrough, O'Reilly scoring in the 53rd minute. The goal brought an immediate response from Dundalk, who equalised through Arthur Kelly inside two minutes. In the 70th minute Kelly scored his second with a shot from the edge of the penalty area and, with Cork fading, Johnny Lavery made it 3–1 to Dundalk with eight minutes remaining to seal Dundalk's first FAI Cup win. The victory ended what many had come to see as a jinx - that Dundalk would never win the cup, given the number of final and semi-final defeats the club had suffered, and an excited pitch invasion delayed the trophy presentation. Five weeks later they were unofficially crowned "Champions of All Ireland", after winning the inaugural Dublin and Belfast Inter-City Cup.

Details

References
Bibliography

Citations

External links
British Pathé "Dundalk's First Cup"

FAI Cup finals
Fai Cup Final 1942
FAI Cup Final, 1942
FAI Cup Final